Alex Hon (born 26 August 1976 in Hong Kong) is a former professional darts player from Hong Kong.

Career
Hon almost qualified for the 2011 PDC World Darts Championship, but lost in the final of the Chinese qualifier to Scott MacKenzie. He also lost in the final of the 2012 Hong Kong Open to Ryan Ocampo. A victory over Yuanjun Liu saw Han qualify for the 2015 World Championship, where he lost 4–0 to Nolan Arendse in the preliminary round. Hon lost in the final of the Hong Kong Open for the second time in 2015, this time to Scott MacKenzie.

World Championship results

PDC

 2015: Preliminary round: (lost to Nolan Arendse 0–4) (legs)

References

External links

1976 births
Living people
Hong Kong darts players
Professional Darts Corporation associate players